The Concerto for Wind Ensemble is a concerto for wind ensemble in five movements by the American composer Steven Bryant.

Composition
A performance of the work lasts approximately 33 minutes.  The piece calls for sections of antiphonal players surrounding the audience.

Background
The first movement was originally commissioned as a stand-alone piece in 2006 by Commander Donald Schofield of the United States Air Force Band of Mid-America and premiered February 2007.  However, as the work progressed, Bryant realized that he wanted to expand the piece beyond the parameter of its original commission and deliberately designed the composition as a first movement to a larger work.  Later, he approached conductor Jerry Junkin about expanding the piece into a full Concerto for Wind Ensemble.  Bryant commented on the inception and development of the work, saying:
The remaining four movements were jointly commissioned by a consortium of music schools, including the University of Miami Frost School of Music, and were completed in 2010.  The complete Concerto for Wind Ensemble premiered October 27, 2010, with Junkin leading the University of Texas Wind Ensemble.

Instrumentation
The work is scored for five flutes (1st and 2nd doubling piccolo; 4th doubling alto flute and piccolo; 3rd and 5th antiphonal), two oboes, two bassoons (2nd doubling contrabassoon), six clarinets (3rd doubling E-flat clarinet; 4th, 5th, and 6th antiphonal), bass clarinet (doubling contrabass clarinet), two alto saxophones (1st doubling soprano saxophone), tenor Saxophone, baritone saxophone, six trumpets (1st, 2nd, and 5th doubling piccolo trumpet; 4th, 5th, and 6th antiphonal), four French horns (3rd and 4th antiphonal), four trombones, euphonium, tuba, harp, contrabass, and percussion.

Reception
Lawrence Budmen of The Classical Review compared the virtuosity of the piece to Béla Bartók's Concerto for Orchestra and called it a "bravura ensemble vehicle."  Budmen nevertheless gave the work mixed praise, writing:

References

Compositions by Steven Bryant
2007 compositions
2010 compositions
Bryant
21st-century classical music